This is a list of electoral results for the electoral district of Nanango in Queensland state elections.

Members for Nanango

Election results

Elections in the 2020s

Elections in the 2010s

Elections in the 2000s

Elections in the 1940s

Elections in the 1930s

Elections in the 1920s

Elections in the 1910s 

 Sitting member Robert Hodge was elected at the previous election as a Farmers' Union candidate. He joined the National Party before this election.

References

Queensland state electoral results by district